The 1968–69 Baltimore Bullets season was their eighth season in the NBA. The Bullets continued to rebuild through the draft by selecting center Wes Unseld, a 2-time All-American from Louisville.  Unseld would have an immediate impact for the Bullets. He finished 2nd in the NBA in rebounding with 18.2 rebounds per game as the Bullets went from worst to first posting a league best 57–25 record. Rookie Wes Unseld won both the Rookie of the Year and MVP.  In the playoffs, the Bullets would show their inexperience as they were swept in 4 straight games by the New York Knicks.

Roster

Regular season

Season standings

Record vs. opponents

Game log

Playoffs

|- align="center" bgcolor="#ffcccc"
| 1
| March 27
| New York
| L 101–113
| Earl Monroe (32)
| Wes Unseld (13)
| Monroe, Unseld (3)
| Baltimore Civic Center11,941
| 0–1
|- align="center" bgcolor="#ffcccc"
| 2
| March 29
| @ New York
| L 91–107
| Earl Monroe (29)
| Wes Unseld (27)
| Kevin Loughery (4)
| Madison Square Garden19,500
| 0–2
|- align="center" bgcolor="#ffcccc"
| 3
| March 30
| New York
| L 116–119
| Kevin Loughery (29)
| Wes Unseld (14)
| Kevin Loughery (7)
| Baltimore Civic Center9,927
| 0–3
|- align="center" bgcolor="#ffcccc"
| 4
| April 2
| @ New York
| L 108–115
| Monroe, Unseld (25)
| Wes Unseld (20)
| Kevin Loughery (7)
| Madison Square Garden19,500
| 0–4
|-

Awards and honors
Earl Monroe, All-NBA First Team 
Wes Unseld, All-NBA First Team
Wes Unseld, NBA Rookie of the Year
Wes Unseld, NBA Most Valuable Player

References

Bullets on Basketball Reference

Washington Wizards seasons
Baltimore Bullets
Baltimore Bullets
Baltimore Bullets